Karan (Qaran) is a rural locality (a village) in Shafranovsky Selsoviet, Alsheyevsky District, Bashkortostan, Russia. The population was 76 as of 2010. There are 2 streets.

Geography 
Karan is located 23 km west of Rayevsky (the district's administrative centre) by road. Kolonka is the nearest rural locality.

References 

Rural localities in Alsheyevsky District